Peter Lucas Nance (born February 19, 2000) is an American former college basketball player for the North Carolina Tar Heels of the Atlantic Coastal Conference.

High school career
Nance played at Revere High School. In his senior season, Nance was 6 feet, 10 inches tall and weighed 205 pounds. That year, Nance led Revere to its first district championship, and he was named the Ohio Division II Player of the Year. On June 29, 2017, Nance committed to playing for Northwestern Wildcats men's basketball team starting in the 2018–19 season. In doing so, Nance declined offers from the University of Michigan and the Ohio State University. Nance was a four-star recruit and the highest-ranked recruit in program history. Scout.com ranked him as the 83rd-best overall player and the 19th-best power forward in the country. Meanwhile, 247Sports ranked him 64th overall.

College career

Nance debuted in an exhibition game against the McKendree Bearcats, during which he notched 12 points, eight rebounds, three blocks, and four steals in 19 minutes off the bench. In his first regular season college basketball game, Nance scored three points and provided one assist in a win against the New Orleans Privateers. Nance earned his first collegiate start in an 80–60 loss to the Michigan Wolverines. He averaged 8.5 points and 6.0 rebounds per game as a sophomore. As a junior, Nance averaged 11.1 points, 6.8 rebounds, and 1.8 assists per game. He missed a game against Michigan State on January 15, 2022, due to an ankle injury.

Nance averaged 14.6 points and 6.5 rebounds per game as a senior. After testing the waters in the 2022 NBA draft, Nance ultimately returned to college and transferred to North Carolina.

Career statistics

College

|-
| style="text-align:left;"| 2018–19
| style="text-align:left;"| Northwestern
| 23 || 1 || 13.9 || .347 || .263 || .417 || 1.7 || .8 || .3 || .3 || 2.9
|-
| style="text-align:left;"| 2019–20
| style="text-align:left;"| Northwestern
| 30 || 20 || 26.2 || .400 || .297 || .686 || 6.0 || 1.6 || .3 || 1.0 || 8.5
|-
| style="text-align:left;"| 2020–21
| style="text-align:left;"| Northwestern
| 24 || 23 || 27.7 || .495 || .364 || .784 || 6.8 || 1.8 || .6 || .7 || 11.1
|-
| style="text-align:left;"| 2021–22
| style="text-align:left;"| Northwestern
| 30 || 30 || 27.2 || .497 || .452 || .768 || 6.5 || 2.7 || .3 || 1.1 || 14.6
|- class="sortbottom"
| style="text-align:center;" colspan="2"| Career
| 107 || 74 || 24.0 || .456 || .356 || .729 || 5.4 || 1.8 || .4 || .8 || 9.6

Personal life
Nance is the son of Larry Nance and the younger brother of Larry Nance Jr., both of whom have played in the National Basketball Association. Nance also has an older sister named Casey.

References

External links
North Carolina Tar Heels bio
Northwestern Wildcats bio

2000 births
Living people
21st-century African-American sportspeople
African-American basketball players
American men's basketball players
Basketball players from Akron, Ohio
North Carolina Tar Heels men's basketball players
Northwestern Wildcats men's basketball players
Power forwards (basketball)